Muggles' Mansion is the third studio album of South Korean music producer Code Kunst. It was released on February 28, 2017 through Highgrnd. It was nominated for Hip-Hop Album of the Year at the Korean Hip-hop Awards and peaked at number 26 on the Gaon Album Chart.

Background 
In an interview with Sports World, Code Kunst explained how the album was made.
I started planning this album when I made "Parachute". I expressed the emotions I felt at a gathering of many musicians in the songs. Although not all rappers think so, there are people who think that they have risen in status if their music sells well. I wanted to tell them that they are the same as ordinary people through music.

Music and lyrics 
Code Kunst thinks of himself as "an ordinary person who makes music, not a celebrity", so he centered the album around this theme. He announces that he is an artist in "Artistic" and talks about his past and present in "Perfume" and "This Is". He compares love to water and fire in "Fire Water" and addresses depression that everyone has in "Born from the Blue". He suggests living slowly in "Cruz" and depicts common fights in relationships in "X". He talks about youth in "Parachute" and religion in "Beside Me". He asserts that life is hard and society is chaotic, but we should ignore them and travel in "Lounge" and wraps up the latter half of the album. Lastly, he adds a track after the outro to show that the life we live is not over yet.

Critical reception 

Garser Dismuke of Blerds Online wrote that the album is "a show of talent, love, and passion" and everything about it is great. Roh Tae-yang of IZM wrote that the featuring artists showed their abilities to the fullest even on "intelligent" beats and Code Kunst unraveled his own story by setting up 19 musicians as his personas.

Kim Seong-dae of Music Y wrote that it is "a work in which the owner and the guests stimulate, talk to, and listen to each other and share the results to the world". Lee Jin-seok of Rhythmer praised Code Kunst's "compelling" production but criticized the disappointing performance of some featuring artists.

Lee Taek-yong of IZM rated "Parachute" 3 out of 5 stars. According to him, the groovy beat highlights the strength of Oh Hyuk's voice and makes Dok2's calm rap blend into the song. Above all, it is a "neat" song without excessive emotions.

Year-end lists

Awards and nominations

Track listing

Charts

Sales

References 

2017 albums
Hip hop albums by South Korean artists